John Mac may refer to:

 John McCarthy (conductor) (1916–2009), British choral music conductor
 John Mackintosh Hall, the main cultural centre of Gibraltar
 John McDonogh High School, a school in New Orleans